Wilburn Davis "Bill" Amis IV (pronounced A-miss) (born October 25, 1987) is a former American professional basketball player who last played for Crelan Okapi Aalstar of the Euromillions Basketball League in Belgium.

Early life and college career
Amis was born in Oklahoma City and graduated from Putnam City High School in 2006. He enrolled at Pratt Community College in Kansas and transferred to the University of Hawaiʻi at Mānoa after one year.

Amis played in the forward position  with the Hawaii Rainbow Warriors. In his senior season, Amis was team co-captain with Hiram Thompson and was a second-team All-Western Athletic Conference selection. He averaged 15.2 points and 7.8 rebounds. After graduating from Hawaii, Amis tried out with his hometown NBA team Oklahoma City Thunder.

Professional career
For the 2011–12 season he signed with Tartu Ülikool Korvpallimeeskond of Estonia.

In July 2013, Amis signed with Eisbären Bremerhaven of Germany. However, he did not passed the tryout period so he was released  before the season began. He then moved to Cyprus and signed with Keravnos.

In July 2014, he signed with Steaua București of Romania.

In June 2016, Amis signed with Crelan Okapi Aalstar of the Euromillions Basketball League in Belgium.

References

External links
Eurobasket.com Profile
Hawaii biography

1987 births
Living people
American expatriate basketball people in Belgium
American expatriate basketball people in Cyprus
American expatriate basketball people in Estonia
American expatriate basketball people in Romania
Basketball players from Oklahoma
Centers (basketball)
CSU Asesoft Ploiești players
Forwards (basketball)
Hawaii Rainbow Warriors basketball players
Keravnos B.C. players
Pratt Beavers men's basketball players
Sportspeople from Oklahoma City
University of Tartu basketball team players
American men's basketball players
Korvpalli Meistriliiga players